Park Range National Forest was established as the Park Range Forest Reserve by the U.S. Forest Service in Colorado on June 12, 1905 with .  It became a National Forest on March 4, 1907. On July 1, 1908 the entire forest was divided between Routt National Forest and Hayden National Forest and the name was discontinued.

References

External links
Forest History Society
Listing of the National Forests of the United States and Their Dates (from the Forest History Society website) Text from Davis, Richard C., ed. Encyclopedia of American Forest and Conservation History. New York: Macmillan Publishing Company for the Forest History Society, 1983. Vol. II, pp. 743-788.

Former National Forests of Colorado
1905 establishments in Colorado
Protected areas established in 1905
1908 disestablishments in Colorado
Protected areas disestablished in 1908